The Draken class (Dragon) was a submarine class built for the Swedish Navy from 1960 to 1962. A total of six submarines were delivered. Four of the boats were modernised in 1981–82. Draken, Vargen, Nordkaparen and Springaren were ordered from Kockums. Gripen and Delfinen were from Karlskrona. These boats were decommissioned 1988-90 and were succeeded by the Sjöormen-class and Näcken-class submarines.

The names of the six Draken class are Draken, Gripen, Vargen, Delfinen, Nordkaparen and Springaren.

One submarine was preserved and can today been seen at the Maritiman in Gothenburg.

References
 Conway's All the World's Fighting Ships 1947-1995

Submarine classes